is a national highway of Japan that traverses the western side of Aomori Prefecture, traveling south to north. The  highway begins as a concurrent route with National Route 7 in central Hirosaki, it then leaves National Route 7 in Fujisaki and travels north through the municipalities of Itayanagi, Tsuruta, Goshogawara, and Nakadomari before ending at an intersection with National Route 280 in Sotogahama. In a unique feature, a  section of the route on Cape Tappi is a staircase.

Route description

National Route 339 begins as a concurrent route with National Route 7 in central Hirosaki, northeast of Undōkōenmae Station. Shortly after, the highway has an interchange with National Routes 102, 394, and Aomori Route 109. After passing through the city and entering the town of Fujisaki, it leaves National Route 7 and turns northwest, paralleling the downstream path of the Iwaki River. In Itayanagi, the route curves to the north again, heading directly towards central Goshogawara. After entering Goshogawara, the highway intersects National Route 101. The two highways parallel one another in central Goshogawara before diverging, Route 101 turns west and Route 339 curves northeast. North of the central district of Goshogawara, the highway connects to the Tsugaru Expressway, a limited-access bypass of the city, at Goshogawara-kita Interchange.

Continuing north, the highway begins its journey across to the Tsugaru Peninsula to Cape Tappi at its northern tip. In the former town of Kanagi, the highway draws closer to the parallel Tsugaru Railway. They parallel one another, crossing out of Goshogawara, until they reach central Nakadomari, where the railway terminates while the highway continues north out of the town. Upon leaving Nakadomari the first time, the highway re-enters Goshogawara and curves northwest along the northern shore of Lake Jūsan. Eventually the route arrives at the Sea of Japan coast of the peninsula, it curves north here and eventually enters Nakadomari once again. As the highway approaches Cape Tappi, it winds its way across the western Tsugaru Mountains into the former town of Minmaya (now part of Sotogahama); due to the sharp curves and rapid changes in elevation, this section of the highway is closed during the winter when weather conditions would make the feature impassable. At Cape Tappi, a  section of the highway is a staircase made up of 362 stairs, the only one of its kind among the national highways of Japan. This section of the highway is open only to pedestrian traffic and is subject to closure in the winter. After the staircase section ends, the highway continues southeast away from the cape along the coast of the Tsugaru Strait. The route terminates at an intersection with National Route 280, just short of Sotogahama's border with Imabetsu.

History
The staircase at Cape Tappi was built as a joint effort between local people and the Japan Self-Defense Forces. When the national government was looking for local roads to incorporate into the planned National Route 339, the stairs were left in place and designated as part of the proposed highway because a normal road would be too steep and narrow. National Route 339 was established by the Cabinet of Japan in 1975 along the stairway and other local roads between Hirosaki and then-extant Minamaya (now part of Sotogahama). On 18 July 2018, a  section of the highway was realigned just north of central Goshogawara as a measure to improve its level of safety and its access to the Tsugaru Expressway. This section is referred to as the Goshogawara-kita Bypass.

Major junctions
The route lies entirely within Aomori Prefecture.

See also

References

External links

National highways in Japan
Roads in Aomori Prefecture
Stairways